Paul A. Lowe Jr. (born May 19, 1959) is an American politician who has served in the North Carolina Senate from the 32nd district since 2015.

References

External links

1959 births
Living people
Democratic Party North Carolina state senators
21st-century American politicians